All-Time Greatest Hits is a 2-LP compilation album by Roy Orbison released in 1972, featuring the original Monument Records recordings.  The album was re-released on compact disc by CBS Records in 1989. The album was given a high-quality digital remastering from the original analog master tapes by Steve Hoffman for DCC Compact Classics, Inc. in 1997, catalog number GZS-1118. In 2008, Mobile Fidelity Sound Lab (MFSL) released a half-speed mastered, limited edition, 2-LP version on 180 gm. vinyl, catalog number MFSL 2-304.  This MFSL release, remastered by Rob LoVerde and Shawn R. Britton, has received positive reviews for sound quality.

Track listing

References

1972 greatest hits albums
Roy Orbison compilation albums
Albums produced by Fred Foster
Monument Records compilation albums